Dusan Marinkovic (born 22 May 2000) is a Serbian footballer currently playing as a forward.

Career statistics

Club

Notes

References

Living people
1999 births
Serbian footballers
Serbian expatriate footballers
Association football forwards
Singapore Premier League players
Balestier Khalsa FC players
Serbian expatriate sportspeople in China
Expatriate footballers in China
Serbian expatriate sportspeople in Singapore
Expatriate footballers in Singapore